King's three-toed slider or King's slider (Lerista kingi)  is a species of skink found in Western Australia.

References

Lerista
Reptiles described in 2007
Taxa named by Lawrence Alec Smith
Taxa named by Mark Adams (herpetologist)